Vincent Boreing (November 24, 1839 – September 16, 1903) was a U.S. Representative from Kentucky.

Biography
Boreing was born near Jonesboro, Washington County, Tennessee in 1839. He moved with his father to Laurel County, Kentucky, in 1847.
He attended Laurel Seminary, London, Kentucky, and Tusculum College, Greenville, Tennessee, and was enlisted as a private in the Union Army in Company A, 24th Regiment Kentucky Volunteer Infantry on November 1, 1861. Boreing was commissioned as the first lieutenant for meritorious conduct.

Early careers
In 1868 through 1872, Boreing served as the county superintendent of public schools. Later in 1875, he established the Mountain Echo in London, the first Republican newspaper published in southeastern Kentucky.

Boreing served in various positions in the 1880s. He served as a county judge in 1886, president of the Cumberland Valley Land Co. in 1887, president of the First National Bank of London in 1888, and as a department commander of the Grand Army of the Republic in Kentucky in 1889.

U.S. Representative career
Boreing was elected as a Republican to the Fifty-sixth, Fifty-seventh, and Fifty-eighth Congresses, serving from March 4, 1899, until his death in London on September 16, 1903. He was buried at the Pine Grove Cemetery.

Legacy
Vincent Boreing is the namesake of the community of Boreing, Kentucky.

See also
List of United States Congress members who died in office (1900–49)

References

1839 births
1903 deaths
People from Washington County, Tennessee
Tusculum University alumni
Union Army officers
Republican Party members of the United States House of Representatives from Kentucky
19th-century American politicians
Grand Army of the Republic officials